The JACK Quartet is an American string quartet dedicated to the performance of contemporary classical music.  It was founded in 2005 and is based in New York City. The four founding members are violinists Christopher Otto and Ari Streisfeld, violist John Pickford Richards, and cellist Kevin McFarland. In 2016, violinist Austin Wulliman and cellist Jay Campbell joined the quartet, replacing Streisfeld and McFarland. The quartet met while attending the Eastman School of Music, and they have studied closely with the Kronos Quartet, Arditti Quartet, and Muir String Quartet.

JACK has received strong critical reception for their performances of quartets by Iannis Xenakis, Georg Friedrich Haas, Helmut Lachenmann and Steve Reich, and has performed at venues around the world, including Carnegie Hall, New York's Lincoln Center, London's Wigmore Hall, and Amsterdam's Muziekgebouw. The group has also been heard at many contemporary music festivals, including the Donaueschingen Festival, the Lucerne Festival, the Bali Arts Festival, the Reykjavik Arts Festival, and the Venice Biennale.

The JACK Quartet's radio credits include appearances on WNYC's New Sounds and Soundcheck, "The Music Show" from Australian National Broadcasting, and a full concert broadcast by NPR.

The group has initiated many educational residencies with composition students from a variety of institutions including New York University, Columbia University, The University of Iowa and Berklee College of Music.

Their album Lines Made By Walking was nominated for a Grammy Award for Best Chamber Music/Small Ensemble Performance at the 2022 Grammy Awards ceremony.

Quartet members

Christopher Otto, violin
Austin Wulliman, violin
John Pickford Richards, viola
Jay Campbell, cello

Recordings

References

External links
JACK Quartet official site
Colbert Artists Management, Inc.
Interview with the JACK Quartet

American string quartets
Contemporary classical music ensembles
Musical groups from New York City
2007 establishments in New York City
Musical groups established in 2007